"Robbie's Song for Jesus" is a song written by Robbie MacNeill and performed by Anne Murray.  The song reached #7 on the Canadian Adult Contemporary chart and #17 on both the Canadian Country chart and the Canadian Pop chart in 1972. The song appeared on her 1972 album, Annie.  The song was produced by Brian Ahern.

Chart performance

Anne Murray

References

Songs about Jesus
1972 singles
Anne Murray songs
Capitol Records singles
1972 songs
Song recordings produced by Brian Ahern (producer)